Derbyshire County Cricket Club in 1952 was the cricket season when the English club Derbyshire had been playing for eighty one years. It was their forty-eighth season in the County Championship and they won eleven matches and lost eight to finish fourth in the County Championship.

1952 season
 
Derbyshire played 28 games in the County Championship, and one match against the touring Indians. They won eleven matches altogether. Guy Willatt was in his second year as captain.  Charlie Elliott was top scorer and C Gladwin took most wickets for the club and was fifth nationally. There were no new players in the Derbyshire team.

Matches

{| class="wikitable" width="100%"
! bgcolor="#efefef" colspan=6 | List of matches
|- bgcolor="#efefef"
!No.
!Date
!V
!Result 
!Margin
!Notes
 |- 
 |1
|7 May 1952  
|Middlesex    Lord's Cricket Ground, St John's Wood  
|bgcolor="#FF0000"|Lost 
| 9 wickets
|    Moss 5–15 
|- 
|2
| 10 May 1952  
| Essex  County Ground, Chelmsford  
|bgcolor="#FF0000"|Lost 
| 9 wickets
|    R Smith 5–83 and 5–33; C Gladwin 5–41 
|- 
|3
| 17 May 1952 
| Leicestershire County Ground, Derby  
|bgcolor="#FFCC00"|Drawn
| 
|    Goodwin 5–44; C Gladwin 5–52
|- 
|4
| 21 May 1952
|  WorcestershireQueen's Park, Chesterfield  
|bgcolor="#00FF00"|Won 
| 10 wickets
|    GL Willatt 146; Perks 5–98; C Gladwin 5–67 
|- 
|5
| 24 May 1952 
| Yorkshire Bramall Lane, Sheffield  
|bgcolor="#FF0000"|Lost 
| Innings and 26 runs
|    Wilson 230; Halliday 6–79
|- 
|6
| 31 May 1952
| Warwickshire County Ground, Derby  
|bgcolor="#00FF00"|Won 
| Innings and 42 runs
|    Pritchard 6–76; C Gladwin 5–24
|- 
|7
| 4 Jun 1952  
| Lancashire  Old Trafford, Manchester 
|bgcolor="#FF0000"|Lost 
| 83 runs
|    HL Jackson 9–60; C Gladwin 5–89; Hilton 6–34 
|- 
|8
| 7 Jun 1952 
| Yorkshire Queen's Park, Chesterfield  
|bgcolor="#00FF00"|Won 
| 81 runs
|    AC Revill 101; GL Willatt 113; Wardle 5–72
|- 
|9
| 11 Jun 1952  
|  Sussex   Rutland Recreation Ground, Ilkeston 
|bgcolor="#00FF00"|Won 
| 100 runs
|    Wood 5–73; Oakman 5–32 
|- 
|10
| 14 Jun 1952
| Nottinghamshire  Trent Bridge, Nottingham 
|bgcolor="#FFCC00"|Drawn
| 
|    Martin 122; Hardstaff 116; A Hamer 161; Stocks 5–64 
|- 
|11
| 18 Jun 1952  
| Somerset County Ground, Derby 
|bgcolor="#FFCC00"|Drawn
| 
|    
|- 
|12
| 21 Jun 1952  
| Northamptonshire  Queen's Park, Chesterfield  
|bgcolor="#00FF00"|Won 
| 8 wickets
|    Brookes 152
|- 
|13
| 28 Jun 1952 
| Glamorgan   St Helen's, Swansea 
|bgcolor="#FFCC00"|Drawn
| 
|    AEG Rhodes 5–56; C Gladwin 5–50 
|- 
|14
| 5 Jul 1952  
| Lancashire  Ind Coope Ground, Burton-on-Trent  
|bgcolor="#FFCC00"|Drawn
| 
|    Edrich 117; AEG Rhodes 5–123; Tattershal 7–103; C Gladwin 5–68
|- 
|15
| 9 Jul 1952  
| Indians  Queen's Park, Chesterfield  
|bgcolor="#FFCC00"|Drawn
| 
|    Chowdhury 5–30; HL Jackson 6–39
|- 
|16
| 12 Jul 1952  
| Somerset County Ground, Taunton 
|bgcolor="#FFCC00"|Drawn
| 
|    Gimblet 146 and 116; CS Elliott 168 
|- 
|17
| 16 Jul 1952  
|Middlesex    County Ground, Derby  
|bgcolor="#00FF00"|Won 
| 52 runs
|    A Hamer 110; HL Jackson 6–96; Compton 6–77; AEG Rhodes 5–58 
|- 
|18
| 19 Jul 1952 
| Leicestershire Bath Grounds, Ashby-de-la-Zouch  
|bgcolor="#00FF00"|Won 
| 59 runs
|    Walsh 6–98; HL Jackson 5–18 
|- 
|19
| 23 Jul 1952
|  WorcestershireAmblecote, Stourbridge 
|bgcolor="#00FF00"|Won 
| Innings and 57 runs
|    CS Elliott 122; Lobban 6–52; C Gladwin 7–43 and 9–41 
|- 
|20
| 26 Jul 1952
| Nottinghamshire  Rutland Recreation Ground, Ilkeston 
|bgcolor="#00FF00"|Won 
| Innings and 93 runs
|    Poole 219; A Hamer 165; DB Carr 116
|- 
|21
| 30 Jul 1952  
|  Surrey Queen's Park, Chesterfield 
|bgcolor="#FF0000"|Lost 
| 6 wickets
|    HL Jackson 5–63
|- 
|22
| 2 Aug 1952
| Warwickshire Edgbaston, Birmingham 
|bgcolor="#FFCC00"|Drawn
| 
|    Dollery 100; HL Jackson 5–30; Grove 6–64
|- 
|23
| 6 Aug 1952   
| Kent  St Lawrence Ground, Canterbury 
|bgcolor="#FFCC00"|Drawn
| 
|    C Gladwin 6–81; Page 5-56 
|- 
|24
| 9 Aug 1952  
| Northamptonshire  Wellingborough School Ground 
|bgcolor="#00FF00"|Won 
| 5 wickets
|    Livingston 106; E Smith 5–49; Starkie 5–61 
|- 
|25
| 13 Aug 1952 
| Glamorgan   County Ground, Derby  
|bgcolor="#FF0000"|Lost 
| 2 wickets
|   DC Morgan 5–38 
|- 
|26
| 16 Aug 1952
| Hampshire Queen's Park, Chesterfield  
|bgcolor="#FFCC00"|Drawn
| 
|   AC Revill 101; C Gladwin 5–30
|- 
|27
| 20 Aug 1952  
|  Surrey Kennington Oval  
|bgcolor="#FF0000"|Lost 
| 212 runs
|    C Gladwin 5–44; Lock 6–16 
|- 
|28
| 23 Aug 1952
|  Gloucestershire  Park Road Ground, Buxton 
|bgcolor="#00FF00"|Won 
| 29 runs
|    Scott 6–45; Lambert 7–75 
|- 
|29
| 30 Aug 1952  
|  Sussex   County Ground, Hove  
|bgcolor="#FF0000"|Lost 
| 130 runs
|    Marlar 5–20; Oakes 5–31
|-

Statistics

County Championship batting averages

County Championship bowling averages

Wicket Keeping
GO Dawkes 	Catches 51, Stumping 12

See also
Derbyshire County Cricket Club seasons
1952 English cricket season

References

1952 in English cricket
Derbyshire County Cricket Club seasons